Military Regional Command I/Bukit Barisan is an Indonesian Army Regional Military Command that covers the Sumatran provinces of North Sumatra, West Sumatra, Riau and Riau Islands. The command takes its name from the Barisan Mountains.

Its Command Day is marked annually on 20 June, the date of the reformation of the basis of the command, the 1st Territorial Army Bukit Barisan (Komando Tentara Teritorium-I/Bukit Barisan), whose origins date to a Chief of Staff of the Army decision dated 13 December 1949.

Territorial Units 
 Kodim 0201/Medan (self-supporting), based in Medan
 Korem 022/Pantai Timur, based in Pematangsiantar
 Kodim 0203/Langkat
 Kodim 0204/Deli Serdang
 Kodim 0207/Simalungun
 Kodim 0208/Asahan
 Kodim 0209/Labuhan Batu 
 Korem 023/Kawal Samudra, based in Sibolga
 Kodim 0205/Tanah Karo
 Kodim 0206/Dairi
 Kodim 0210/North Tapanuli
 Kodim 0211/Central Tapanuli
 Kodim 0212/South Tapanuli
 Kodim 0213/Nias
 Korem 031/Wirabima, based in Pekanbaru
 Kodim 0301/Pekanbaru
 Kodim 0302/Indragiri Hulu
 Kodim 0313/Kampar
 Kodim 0214/Indragiri Hilir
 Korem 032/Wirabraja, based in Padang
 Kodim 0304/Agam
 Kodim 0305/Pasama
 Kodim 0306/Limapuluh Kota
 Kodim 0307/Tanah Datar
 Kodim 0308/Pariaman
 Kodim 0309/Solok
 Kodim 0310/Sijunjung
 Kodim 0311/South Coast
 Kodim 0312/Padang
 Kodim 0319/Mentawai
 Kodim 0320/Bukittinggi
 Kodim 0321/West Paraman
 Korem 033/Wira Pratama, based in Tanjungpinang
 Kodim 0315/Riau Islands
 Kodim 0316/Batam
 Kodim 0317/Karimun
 Kodim 0318/Natuna
 1st Regional Training Regiment (Rindam I/Bukit Barisan)
 Regiment HQ
 NCO School
 Basic Combat Training Center
 National Defense Training Command 
 Specialist Training School 
 Enlisted Personnel Training Unit

Combat Units & Combat Support Units
 Combat Units
 7th Infantry Brigade/Rimba Raya
 Brigade HQ
 122nd Infantry Battalion/Tombak Sakti
 125th Infantry Battalion/Simbisa
 126th Infantry Battalion/Kala Cakti
 100th Raider Infantry Battalion/Prajurit Setia
 121st Mechanized Infantry Battalion/Macan Kumbang
 123rd Infantry Battalion/Rajawali, under the command of Korem 023/Kawal Samudra
 131st Infantry Battalion/Braja Sakti, under the command of Korem 032/Wirabraja
 132nd infantry Battalion/Bima Sakti, under the command of Korem 031/Wira Bima
 133rd Infantry Battalion/Yudha Sakti, under the command of Korem 032/Wirabraja
 134th Special Raider Infantry Battalion/Tuah Sakti, under the command of Korem 033/Wira Pratama
 1st Composite (Infantry) Battalion/Gardapati
 Combat Support Units
 2nd Field Artillery Battalion/Towed 105/Kilap Sumagan
 2nd Air Defense Artillery Regiment/Sisingamangaraja
 Regiment HQ and HQ Battery
 11th Air Defense Artillery Battalion/Wira Bhuana Yudha
 13th Air Defense Artillery Battalion/Parigha Bhuana Yudha
 004th Air Defense Missile Artillery Detachment/Dumai
 6th Cavalry Battalion/Naga Karimata
 6th Cavalry Company/Rajawali Bhakti Tama
 1st Combat Engineering Battalion/Dhira Dharma
 2nd Combat Engineering Detachment/Prasada Sakti

Support Units
 Construction Engineer detachment (Zidam I/BB)
 Military Police detachment (Pomdam I/BB)
 Supply and Transport detachment (Bekangdam I/BB)
 Communication detachment (Hubdam I/BB)
 Ordnance detachment (Paldam I/BB)
 Intelligence detachment (Inteldam I/BB)
 Information detachment (Pendam I/BB)
 Adjutant General's detachment (Anjendam I/BB)
 Physical Training detachment (Jasdam I/BB)
 Medical detachment (Kesdam I/BB)
 Topography detachment (Topdam I/BB)
 Chaplain detachment (Bintaldam I/BB)
 Finance detachment (Kudam I/BB)
 Judge Advocate General detachment (Kumdam I/BB)

References

Military regional commands of Indonesia
Sumatra
Military units and formations established in 1950
Indonesian Army